CDP-archaeol synthase (CDP-2,3-di-O-geranylgeranyl-sn-glycerol synthase, CTP:2,3-GG-GP ether cytidylyltransferase, CTP:2,3-di-O-geranylgeranyl-sn-glycero-1-phosphate cytidyltransferase) is an enzyme with systematic name CTP:2,3-bis-O-(geranylgeranyl)-sn-glycero-1-phosphate cytidylyltransferase. This enzyme catalyses the following chemical reaction

 CTP + 2,3-bis-O-(geranylgeranyl)-sn-glycero-1-phosphate  diphosphate + CDP-2,3-bis-O-(geranylgeranyl)-sn-glycerol

This enzyme catalyses one of the steps in the biosynthesis of polar lipids in Archaea.

References

External links 
 

EC 2.7.7